Komi may refer to:

Places

Greece
Komi, Tinos, a village in the municipality of Exomvourgo, in the Cycladic islands
Komi, Elis, a settlement in the municipality of Vouprasia

Iran
Komi, Iran, a village in East Azerbaijan Province, Iran

Russia
Komi Republic of Russia
Komi Autonomous Soviet Socialist Republic of the former USSR

Other uses
Komi peoples
Komi language
Komi (Go), compensation points in the board game Go
Komi (restaurant), a restaurant in Washington, D.C.
Kenkey or komi, a West African dish

People with the surname
Richard Komi (born ), Nigerian-born American politician
Naoshi Komi (born 1986), Japanese manga artist
Yota Komi (born 2002), Japanese footballer

Fictional characters:
Shōko Komi, a character in Komi Can't Communicate

People with the given name
Kōmi Hirose  (born 1966), Japanese pop singer
Komi Moreira (born 1968), Togolese cyclist
Komi Akakpo (born 1995), Togolese footballer

See also
Komi Kebir, a village in Famagusta District
Koumi, Nagano, a town in Minamisaku, Nagano, Japan